Mahendra Majhi (1920-1971) was an Indian politician. He was elected to the Lok Sabha, the lower house of the Parliament of India as a member of the Swatantra Party.

References

External links
Official biographical sketch in Parliament of India website

1920 births
Lok Sabha members from Odisha
India MPs 1967–1970
1971 deaths
Swatantra Party politicians